Kings Langley is a suburb of Sydney, in the state of New South Wales, Australia. Kings Langley is located 28.3 kilometres north-west in a straight line from the Sydney central business district in the local government area of Blacktown City council. 

The suburb extends from the south-west of Vardys Road and Sunnyholt Road, with the north-east adjacent the Glenwood, Bella Vista and Baulkham Hills areas.

Homely, a real estate website, gave an overall score of 9.4/10 and ranked it the 14th-best suburb in Sydney.

History 
Early settler Matthew Pearce (1762-1831) called his  land grant after Kings Langley Manor House in Hertfordshire, England, where he was said to have been born. Pearce’s grant was situated on the opposite side of the Old Windsor Road to the present day suburb of Kings Langley. A housing scheme used the name in the 1970s. It was recognised as a "neighbourhood" in 1976 and classified as a suburb in 1987.

Transport
Kings Langley is well served by public transport, including Hillsbus routes 661, 706, 715, 705 and Busways routes 743 and 718.

The suburb is served by Joseph Banks and Troubadour bus stations on the North-West T-way, providing connections to North Sydney (602X), Sydney CBD (607X, 607N),  (663, 664, 665), Castle Hill (662), Norwest (664) and Parramatta (660-665) as well as James Cook station on the Blacktown- Parklea T-way, providing services to Blacktown (730-735), Castle Hill (730), Rouse Hill (731, 735) and Schofields (734).

Kings Langley is 10 minutes away from Seven Hills and Marayong Sydney Trains stations, and also 10 minutes away from Bella Vista and Norwest Metro Trains Sydney stations.

A trip to the Sydney CBD in the off-peak can take in 27 minutes via the M2 Hills Motorway. Access to Western Sydney was improved by the opening of the Westlink M7 in December 2005.

Services

Kings Langley has two shopping centres. Kings Langley Shopping Centre is located on James Cook Drive and includes both a Coles and a Woolworths Supermarket, as well as many specialty stores. the smaller Solander Centre has a convenience store, Speedway petrol station and several specialty stores. Kings Langley is close to both Blacktown Hospital and the Norwest Private Hospital.

Education 

Kings Langley is served by several government schools. Two primary schools are located in the suburb: Vardys Road Primary School on Vardys Road (established in 1959) and Kings Langley Public School (established in 1981) on Isaac Smith Parade. There is no high school in Kings Langley, but the suburb falls in the catchment area for Blacktown Boys High School, Blacktown Girls High School and Seven Hills High School. Many parents in Kings Langley choose to have their children educated in nearby  at Crestwood High School and Model Farms High School.

Demographics 
According to the 2016 census of Population, there were 9,353 people in Kings Langley.
 Aboriginal and Torres Strait Islander people made up 1.1% of the population. 
 71.6% of people were born in Australia. The next most common countries of birth were England 3.2%, India 2.3%, China 1.7% and New Zealand 1.6%.
 76.3% of people spoke only English at home. Other languages spoken at home included Mandarin 2.1%, Italian 1.4%, Cantonese 1.2%, Arabic 1.2% and Spanish 1.1%. 
 The most common responses for religion were Catholic 32.1%, No Religion 20.4% and Anglican 17.8%,.
 Unemployment in the 2016 census was recorded at 4.2%. 
 Median family income was $2,258 per week compared to the Australian median of $1,734.

References 

Suburbs of Sydney
City of Blacktown
Populated places established in 1976
1976 establishments in Australia